Joseph Levering (1874–1943) was an American actor, screenwriter and film director. He was married to the actress Marian Swayne.

Selected filmography

Director
 The Little American (1917)
 Little Miss Fortune (1917)
 The Little Samaritan (1917)
 The Road Between (1917)
 His Temporary Wife (1920)
 Determination (1922)
 Flesh and Spirit (1922)
 The Tie That Binds (1923)
 Who's Cheating? (1924)
 Lilies of the Streets (1925)
 Unrestrained Youth (1925)
 Defenders of the Law (1931)
 Sea Devils (1931)
 Cheating Blondes (1933)
 Rolling Caravans (1938)
 Stagecoach Days (1938)
 Pioneer Trail (1938)
 In Early Arizona (1938)
 Phantom Gold (1938)
 The Law Comes to Texas (1939)
 Frontiers of '49 (1939)
 Lone Star Pioneers (1939)

Actor
 Brennan of the Moor (1913)
 Shadows of the Moulin Rouge (1913)
 The Temptations of Satan (1914)

Writer
 Riders of the Frontier (1939)

References

Bibliography
 Michael R. Pitts. Poverty Row Studios, 1929–1940: An Illustrated History of 55 Independent Film Companies, with a Filmography for Each. McFarland & Company, 2005.

External links

1874 births
1943 deaths
American male film actors
American film directors
20th-century American screenwriters